The Infectious Diseases Hospital “Dr. Francisco Javier Muñiz" is a public metropolitan-area hospital serving Buenos Aires, Argentina and the surrounding area since 1882. As the name implies, the hospital specializes in infectious diseases.  The address for the hospital is Uspallata 2272 and is located in the neighborhood of Parque Patricios in Buenos Aires.

History 

The Infectious Diseases Hospital Francisco Javier Muñiz (in Spanish: Hospital de Infecciosas “Dr. Francisco Javier Muñiz") is the oldest infectious-diseases hospital in Latin America – over 100 years old. It became known as "Hospital of the pests" or the "Plague Hospital" and was preceded by the old House of Insulation, which served as a quarantine station during epidemics of cholera, yellow fever and smallpox. The new House of Insulation, built in the neighborhood of Parque Patricios ("Barracks Hospital"), was renamed in 1904 in memory of Francisco Javier Muñiz, an Argentine military doctor in the mid-nineteenth century, naturalist, paleontologist, Senator, and Dean of the Faculty of Medicine. Its technical name is "Porteño Care Centre and National Reference Regional Infectious-Contagious Disease". It receives numerous national and foreign undergraduate and postgraduate students in its Departments of Infectious Diseases and Respiratory Diseases.

Hospital Size 

When first opened, Hospital Muniz had more than 1,100 hospital beds; the number of beds is now about 400.

HIV 

80% of the cases handled by this hospital are now linked to HIV and AIDS. The first case of HIV in Buenos Aires appeared in 1984 and was treated at Hospital Muñiz.

Current Mission 
The Hospital Muñiz is a national and regional reference hospital for infectious diseases.  All infectious disease are diagnosed and treated at this hospital to include tuberculosis, pneumonia, botulism, leptospirosis, tetanus, leprosy, among others.  For example, in 2007 Hospital Muniz responded to an alleged threat of anthrax, analyzing 8,000 samples.

Patient Population 

The majority of patients are now are treated as outpatients in the Hospital.  It is believed that 80% of patients arrive from the interior parts of the country, and not from the city of Buenos Aires. The hospital built a pavilion for inmates due to the high rate of infection of the AIDS virus in the national prisons. The Hospital also has "Unit 29" whose function is to serve the children of mothers carrying the HIV virus.

References

External links 
 Official Website
 Architectural and historical information about the hospital
 The Infectious Diseases Hospital Francisco Javier Muñiz article written for the newspaper "Botánico Sur"
 Hospital Muñiz celebrates 100 years of service written by Elena Peralta for the newspaper "Clarín", November 15, 2004

Hospitals in Buenos Aires
Hospital buildings completed in 1882
Buildings and structures in Buenos Aires